Irish Travellers (meaning "the walking people"), also known as Pavees or Mincéirs (Shelta: Mincéirí), are a traditionally peripatetic indigenous ethno-cultural group originating in Ireland.

They are predominantly English-speaking, though many also speak Shelta, a language of mixed English and Irish origin. The majority of Irish Travellers are Roman Catholic, the predominant religion in the Republic of Ireland. They are one of several groups identified as "Travellers", related groups being the Scottish Travellers and English Travellers who lean more towards Evangelical Protestantism.

They are often incorrectly referred to as "Gypsies", but Irish Travellers are not genetically related to the Romani, who are of Indo-Aryan origin. Genetic analysis has shown Travellers to be of Irish extraction, and that they likely diverged from the settled Irish population in the 1600s, likely during the time of the Cromwellian conquest of Ireland. Centuries of cultural isolation have led Travellers to become genetically distinct from the settled Irish. Traveller rights groups long advocated for ethnic status from the Irish government, succeeding in 2017.

Irish Traveller communities can be found in Ireland, the United Kingdom, the United States and Canada. As of 2016, there are 32,302 Travellers within Ireland. They represent 0.7% of the total population of the Republic of Ireland. There are different estimates about the size of the total population of people with Traveller ancestry, because many people of Traveller descent do not declare themselves Travellers. The United Kingdom alone is believed to be home to up to 300,000 Traveller people.

Nomenclature

Origins
There are numerous theories and oral histories surrounding the origins of Irish Travellers as a distinct group. Research has been complicated by the fact that the group appears to have no written records of its own, with oral tradition through storytelling being the primary method through which the Traveller community disseminates its own history and culture.

Deeper documentation of Shelta and the Travellers dates to the 1830s, but knowledge of Irish Travellers has been seen from the 1100s, as well as the 1500s~1800s. Many decrees against begging in England were directed at Travellers, passed by King Edward VI around 1551; for example the "Acte for tynckers and pedlers". The culture of Irish Travellers resembles the culture of other itinerant communities with regard to self-employment; family networks; birth, marriage, and burial rituals; taboos; and folklore. They worked with metal and travelled throughout Ireland working at making items such as ornaments, jewellery, and horse harnesses to earn a living. As a result, they (along with other itinerant groups) were referred to as "tinkers" or "tinklers" (meaning "tin smiths"), terms regarded in later years as derogatory.

Origin theories
Many different theories have been put forward to explain the origins of Ireland's itinerant population. It has been suggested Travellers are related to Romani due to a similarly itinerant lifestyle, but genetic testing has shown no evidence for a recent ancestral component between Irish Travellers and Romani Travellers. Another theory is of a pre-Gaelic origin, where Travellers are descended from a community that lived in Ireland prior to the arrival of the Celts. Once Ireland was claimed as a Celtic homeland, this group was seen as lower class. There is also a theory that an indigenous, itinerant community of craftsmen are the ancestors of Travellers, and unlike the Celts, they never settled down. Other speculations on their origin are that they were descended from those Irish who were made homeless during the Cromwellian conquest in the 1650s, or made homeless in either the 1741 or the 1840s famine, or due to eviction.

According to Helleiner (2003), current scholarship is investigating the background of Gaelic Ireland before the English Tudor conquest. The mobile nature and traditions of a Gaelic society based on pastoralism rather than land tenure before this event implies that Travellers represent descendants of the Gaelic social order marginalised during the change-over to an English landholding society. An early example of this mobile element in the population, and how displacement of clans can lead to increased nomadism within aristocratic warrior societies, is the displacement of the Clan Murtough O'Connors after the Norman invasion.

Population genetics 
Genetic evidence reported in 2000 regarding Irish Travellers supported Irish ancestry; several distinct subpopulations; and the distinctiveness of the midland counties due to Viking influence. In 2011, researchers at the Royal College of Surgeons in Dublin and the University of Edinburgh analysed DNA samples from 40 Travellers. The study provided evidence that Irish Travellers are a genetically distinct Irish ethnic minority which has been distinct from the settled Irish community for at least 1,000 years: The report claimed that Travellers are as distinct from the settled community as Icelanders are from Norwegians.

In 2017 a further genetic study using profiles of 50 Irish Travellers, 143 European Roma, 2,232 settled Irish, 2,039 British and 6,255 European or worldwide individuals, confirmed ancestral origins from within the general population of Ireland. An estimated time of divergence between the settled population and Travellers was set at a minimum of 8 generations ago, with generations at 30 years, hence 240 years and a maximum of 14 generations or 420 years ago. The best fit was estimated at 360 years ago, giving an approximate date in the 1650s.

Irish Travellers are not an entirely homogeneous group, instead reflecting some of the variation also seen in the settled population. Four distinct genetic clusters were identified in the 2017 study, and these match social groupings within the community.

Irish Travellers, particularly those that experienced a life of nomadism prior to the 2002 Irish legislation that altered living conditions, exhibit distinct gut microbiota compared to other Irish citizens, which is comparable to gut microbiomes observed in non-industrialized societies.

Genetic disease studies
Genetic studies by Miriam Murphy, David Croke, and other researchers identified certain genetic diseases such as galactosemia that are more common in the Irish Traveller population, involving identifiable allelic mutations that are rarer among the rest of the community.

Two main hypotheses have arisen, speculating whether:
 the prevalence resulted from marriages made largely within and among the Traveller community,
or
 suggesting shared descent from an original Irish carrier long ago with ancestors unrelated to the rest of the Irish population.
In their conclusion Murphy, McHugh, et al write that:
The fact that Q188R is the sole mutant allele among the Travellers as compared to the non-Traveller group may be the result of a founder effect in the isolation of a small group of the Irish population from their peers as founders of the Traveller sub-population. This would favour the second, endogenous, hypothesis of Traveller origins."

More specifically, they found that Q188R was found in 100% of Traveller samples, and in 89% of other Irish samples, indicating that the Traveller group was typical of the larger Irish population.

Language
Irish Travellers speak English and sometimes one of two dialects of Shelta—Gammon (or Gamin) and Irish Traveller Cant. Shelta has been dated back to the 18th century but may be older. Cant, which derives from Irish, is a combination of English and Shelta.

 writes that the Irish Traveller Gammon vocabulary is derived from pre-13th-century Gaelic idioms with ten per cent Indian origin Romani language vocabulary. Since Shelta is a mixture of English and Irish grammar, the etymology is not straightforward. The language is made up mostly of Irish lexicon, being classified as a grammar-lexicon language with the grammar being English-based. Gaelic language expert Kuno Meyer and Romani language linguist John Sampson both asserted that Shelta existed as far back as the 13th century, 300 years before the first Romani populations arrived in Ireland or Britain.

Shelta is a cryptolect (secret language). Irish Travellers do not like to share the language with outsiders, named "Buffers", or non-Travellers. When speaking Shelta in front of Buffers, Travellers will disguise the structure so as to make it seem like they are not speaking Shelta at all. There is fear that if outsiders know the entirety of the language, it will be used to bring further discrimination to the Traveller community.

The Irish state and Irish Travellers

There was no specific state focus on Travellers prior to the creation of an independent Irish state in 1922. Issues with traditional travelling groups came under loosely defined vagrancy laws, from when Ireland was part of the United Kingdom. In 1959 the 1959–1963 government of Ireland established a "Commission on Itinerancy" in response to calls to deal with the "itinerant problem". This was made up of senior representatives of the Irish state, judges, Gardaí (Irish police), religious organisations and numerous farming lobby groups such as Macra na Feirme. The commission had no Traveller representatives, and while attempts were made to consult Travellers, these were "bizarre" unannounced visits which resulted in little input into the report.

The commission had the following terms of reference:

to enquire into the problem arising from the presence in the country of itinerants in considerable numbers;
to examine the economic, educational, health and social problems inherent in their way of life;
to consider what steps might be taken—to provide opportunities for a better way of life for itinerants,
to promote their absorption into the general community,
pending such absorption, to reduce to a minimum the disadvantages to themselves and to the community resulting from their itinerant habits and
to improve the position generally; and
to make recommendations.

The commission's 1963 report defined "itinerant" as "a person who had no fixed place of abode and habitually wandered from place to place, but excluding travelling show-people and travelling entertainers". It recommended assimilation of Travellers by settling them in fixed dwellings with the ultimate aim being that of essentially ending Traveller identity, viewing the Netherlands' approach to its travelling minority as a model. This assimilation was to be achieved by the effective criminalisation of nomadism, and the report paved the way for an increasing state emphasis on criminal laws and penalties for trespass.

At the time, about 60% of Irish Travellers lived in barrel-roofed horse-drawn wagons, with almost 40% still using tents in summer (fewer in winter).

The Travelling People Review Body (1981–1983) advocated integration rather than assimilation, with provision for serviced halting sites. The Body's membership included Travellers.
The Task Force on the Travelling Community (1993–1995) moved to an intercultural paradigm.

On 30 May 2019 the Oireachtas (Irish parliament) established a joint committee "on Key Issues affecting the Traveller Community".

In May 2021, the Ombudsman for Children, Dr. Niall Muldoon, published a report that was highly critical of the standards of accommodation provided for Travellers, describing some accommodation issues as "deplorable".

Population

Irish Travellers have a higher fertility rate than the general Irish population; the Central Statistics Office of Ireland recorded in 2016 that 44.5% of Traveller women aged 40–49 had five or more children, compared to 4.2% of women overall in this age group. This gap has dramatically reduced over time; in 1987 the Irish Traveller birth rate was at 5.3 children per woman compared to the general Irish population's 2.3, while in 2008 the Irish Traveller birth rate was at 2.9 children per woman compared to the general Irish population's 2.1.

Ireland 
The 2016 census in the Republic of Ireland reported the number of Irish Travellers as 30,987, up from 29,495 in 2011. In 2006 the number was 22,369. A further 1,700 to 2,000 were estimated to live in Northern Ireland.

From the 2006 Irish census, it was determined that 20,975 dwell in urban areas and 1,460 were living in rural areas. With an overall population of just 0.5% some areas were found to have a higher proportion, with high Traveller concentrations in Clare, Dublin, Galway and Limerick. There were found to be 9,301 Travellers in the 0–14 age range, comprising 41.5% of the Traveller population, and a further 3,406 of them were in the 15–24 age range, comprising 15.2%. Children of the age range 0–17 comprised 48.7% of the Traveller population.

Following the findings of the All Ireland Traveller Health Study (estimates for 2008), the figure for Northern Ireland was revised to 3,905 and that for the Republic to 36,224.

Diaspora

United Kingdom 
In 2011, for the first time, the census category "Irish Traveller" was introduced as part of the broader Gypsy/Traveller section. The self reported figure for collective Gypsy/Traveller populations were 63,193 but estimates of Irish Travellers living in Great Britain range are about 15,000 as part of a total estimation of over 300,000 Romani and other Traveller groups in the UK.

The London Boroughs of Harrow and Brent contain significant Irish Traveller populations. In addition to those on various official sites, there are a number who are settled in local authority housing. These are mostly women who wish their children to have a chance at formal education. They and the children may or may not travel in the summer but remain in close contact with the wider Irish Traveller community.

There are also a number of Irish Traveller communities in the Home counties.

United States 
An estimated 10,000 people in the United States are descendants of Travellers who left Ireland, mostly between 1845 and 1860 during the Great Famine. However, there are no official population figures regarding Irish Travellers in the United States as the US census does not recognise them as an ethnic group. While some sources estimate their population in the US to be 10,000, others suggest their population is 40,000. According to research published in 1992, Irish Travellers in the US divide themselves up into groups that are based on historical residence: Ohio Travellers, Georgia Travellers, Texas Travellers, and Mississippi Travellers. The Georgia Travellers' camp is made up of about eight hundred families, the Mississippi Travellers, about three hundred families, and the Texas Travellers, under fifty families."

The largest and most affluent population of about 2,500 lives in Murphy Village, outside of the town of North Augusta, South Carolina. Other communities exist in Memphis, Tennessee, Hernando, Mississippi, and near White Settlement, Texas, where the families stay in their homes during the winter, and leave during the summer, while smaller enclaves can be found across Georgia, Alabama, and Mississippi.

Irish Travellers in the US are said to speak English and Shelta, a form of Cant. The Cant spoken in the US is similar to the Cant spoken in Ireland, but differs in some respects in that the language has transformed into a type of pidgin English over the generations. They typically work in asphalting, spray-painting, laying linoleum, or as itinerant workers to earn their living.

Religion
Travellers have a distinctive approach to religion; the vast majority of them are practising Roman Catholics and they also pay particular attention to issues of healing. Many have been known to follow a strict code of behaviour that dictates some of their moral beliefs and influences their actions. Irish Travellers are known to practice their Catholic faith at holy wells and shrines across Ireland. Travellers were excluded in the past from everyday parish activities in Ireland. Richard O'Brien of the Kerry diocese is a member of the Traveller community who started a groundbreaking initiative to reach out to the Irish Traveller community and help them to be more involved in parish life. The Irish Bishops Conference released a statement to every parish, asking them to welcome Irish Travellers to their towns and villages throughout Ireland.

Education 
In 2004, it was reported that Traveller children often grow up outside educational systems. Traveller children were reported in 2017 to leave education at a younger age than children in the settled community, with 28% leaving the education system by age 13.
One of the causes identified is the historical marginalisation of the community within the educational system. The segregation of Traveller children from their settled peers led to worse outcomes in regard to undertaking state examinations, and levels of numeracy and literacy. The Irish Traveller Movement, a community advocacy group, promotes equal access to education for Traveller children. In the Census of Ireland 2016, 167 Travellers are enumerated as having a third level educational qualification, a rise from 89 in 2011.

In December 2010, the Irish Equality Tribunal ruled in favour of a Traveller child in an anti-discrimination suit which covered the admission practices of CBS High School Clonmel in County Tipperary. In July 2011, the secondary school in Clonmel successfully appealed the decision of the Equality Tribunal that its admission criteria were indirectly discriminatory against children from the Traveller community.

Sports 

Irish Travellers have a long history of bare-knuckle boxing. Toughness and the ability to fight are viewed as particularly important among Traveller men, and their involvement in boxing has extended to traditional amateur and professional boxing. Irish Traveller Francie Barrett represented Ireland at the 1996 Olympics, while Andy Lee fought for Ireland at the 2004 Olympics and later became the first Traveller to win a professional boxing world championship when he won the WBO middleweight title in 2014. Tyson Fury is of Irish Traveller heritage and defeated long-reigning Wladimir Klitschko in 2015 to become the unified heavyweight world champion.

In the Traveller community, bare-knuckle boxing is seen as a way to resolve disputes and uphold family honour, as shown in the 2011 documentary Knuckle. This can lead to injuries, notably "fight bite" where, when punching an opponent, a tooth may cut the hand and bacteria in the opponent's mouth may infect the wound. Such infections can lead to permanent disability if left untreated.

Apart from boxing, Irish Travellers, including women, are involved in sports such as football (soccer) and Gaelic handball.

Health

The health of Irish Travellers is significantly poorer than that of the general population in Ireland. This is evidenced in a 2007 report published in Ireland, which states that over half of Travellers do not live past the age of 39 years. (By comparison, median life expectancy in Ireland is 81.5 years.) Another government report of 1987 found:

From birth to old age, they have high mortality rates, particularly from accidents, metabolic and congenital problems, but also from other major causes of death. Female Travellers have especially high mortality compared to settled women.

In 2007, the Department of Health and Children in the Republic of Ireland, in conjunction with the Department of Health, Social Services and Public Safety in Northern Ireland, commissioned the University College Dublin's School of Public Health and Population Science to conduct a major cross-border study of Travellers' welfare. The study, including a detailed census of Traveller population and an examination of their health status, was expected to take up to three years to complete. The main results of the study were published in 2010.

The birth rate of Irish Travellers has decreased since the 1990s, but they still have one of the highest birth rates in Europe. The birth rate for the Traveller community for the year 2005 was 33.32 per 1,000, possibly the highest birth rate recorded for any community in Europe.

On average there are ten times more driving fatalities within the Traveller community. At 22%, this represents the most common cause of death among Traveller males. Some 10% of Traveller children die before their second birthday, compared to just 1% of the general population. In Ireland, 2.6% of all deaths in the total population were for people aged under 25, versus 32% for Travellers. In addition, 80% of Travellers die before the age of 65.

According to the National Traveller Suicide Awareness Project, Traveller men are over six times more likely to kill themselves than the general population.

Marriage
Marriage among Travellers in their late teens is common. As of the Census of Ireland 2016 58.1% of Irish Travellers were under the age of 25, with 31.9% of this age group married. As of 2016, 201 enumerated Irish Travellers aged 15 to 19 identified themselves as married, down from 250 in 2011. Irish Travellers generally marry other Irish Travellers. Consanguineous marriage is common among Irish Travellers. According to Judith Okely's work on Travellers in Britain in the 1970s, "there is no large time span between puberty and marriage", and the typical marriage age was 16–17 for females and 18–19 for males.

Irish Travellers lived as cohabiters who "married at one time without religious or civil ceremony." Into the early 20th century about one-third of Irish Travellers were "married according to the law."

According to Christopher Griffin, sociology and anthropology lecturer at Edith Cowan University, arranged Irish Traveller marriages in the early 21st century "safeguard the girl's  by securing a man who won't mistreat her." According to Julie Bindel, in Standpoint, some Irish Traveller females in the UK are forced into marriages, but Bindel points out that data is difficult to obtain because "the line between an arranged marriage and a forced one is not always clear."

Social conflict and controversies

Discrimination and prejudice
Travellers are often reported as the subject of explicit political and cultural discrimination, with politicians being elected on promises to block Traveller housing in local communities and individuals frequently refusing service in pubs, shops and hotels.

A 2011 survey by the Economic and Social Research Institute of Ireland concluded that there is widespread ostracism of Travellers in Ireland, and the report concluded that it could hurt the long-term prospects for Travellers, who "need the intercultural solidarity of their neighbours in the settled community. ... They are too small a minority, i.e., 0.5 per cent, to survive in a meaningful manner without ongoing and supportive personal contact with their fellow citizens in the settled community." The general prejudice against Travellers hinders efforts by the central government to integrate Travellers into Irish society. Because Travellers are a minority group within Ireland and the United Kingdom, they have always faced discrimination on the basis of their ethnicity as Travellers. They experience discrimination in not having equal access to education, being denied service in pubs, shops, and hotels, and being subject to derogatory language.

In 2016, the USA's Country Reports on Human Rights Practices for the United Kingdom stated that Irish Travellers reported receiving discrimination on "racial or ethnic grounds" in the country, and stated that the High Court had ruled that the government had illegally discriminated against Travellers by unlawfully subjecting planning applications to special scrutiny.

Work and income
According to the 2016 Irish census, 4,524 of 9,055 Travellers over the age of 15 (50%) were "Unemployed having lost or given up previous job". While 10,653 Travellers were in the labour force, the vast majority, 8,541 (80.2%), were unemployed.  Almost 1 in 8 Travellers (11.3%) stated that they were unable to work due to a disability, which was almost three times the rate of the general population (4.3%).

Many Travellers are breeders of dogs such as lurchers and have a long-standing interest in horse trading. The main fairs associated with them are held annually at Ballinasloe (County Galway), Puck Fair (County Kerry), Ballabuidhe Horse Fair (County Cork), the twice-yearly Smithfield Horse Fair (Dublin inner city) and Appleby (England). They are often involved in dealing scrap metals, e.g., 60% of the raw material for Irish steel is sourced from scrap metal, approximately 50% (75,000 metric tonnes) segregated by the community at a value of more than £1.5 million. Such percentages for more valuable non-ferrous metals may be significantly greater.

Since the majority of Irish Travellers' employment is either self-employment or wage labour, income and financial status varies greatly from family to family. Many families choose not to reveal the specifics of their finances, but when explained it is very difficult to detect any sort of pattern or regular trend of monthly or weekly income. To detect their financial status many look to the state of their possessions: their trailer, motor vehicle, domestic utensils, and any other valuables.

Social identity

Irish Travellers are recognised in British and Irish law as an ethnic group. An ethnic group is defined as one whose members identify with each other, usually on the basis of a presumed common genealogy or ancestry. Ethnic identity is also marked by the recognition from others of a group's distinctiveness and by common cultural, linguistic, religious, behavioural or biological traits.

The European Parliament Committee of Enquiry on Racism and Xenophobia found them to be among the most discriminated-against ethnic groups in Ireland and yet their status remains insecure in the absence of widespread legal endorsement. Travellers are often viewed by settled people in a negative light, perceived as insular, anti-social, 'drop-outs' and 'misfits', or believed to be involved in criminal and mendicant behaviour, or settling illegally on land owned by others.

Violence and crime
In 1960 a government body was set up to conduct research into the Travelling Community in the Republic of Ireland. The Commission on Itinerancy operated under the auspices of the Department of Justice, the persons were appointed by the Junior Minister Charles Haughey. One finding was: that "public brawling fuelled by excessive drinking further added to settled people's fear of Travellers". Furthermore "feuding was felt to be the result of a dearth of pastimes and [of] illiteracy, historically comparable to features of rural Irish life before the Famine".

A 2011 report, conducted by the Irish Chaplaincy in Britain, Voices Unheard: A Study of Irish Travellers in Prison (Mac Gabhann, 2011) found that social, economic and educational exclusion were contributing factors to the "increasingly high levels of imprisonment" of Irish Travellers.

Travellers' sites in the United Kingdom

The passing of the Caravan Sites Act 1968 safeguarded Travellers' right to a site, but the Criminal Justice and Public Order Act 1994 repealed part II of the 1968 act, removing the duty on local authorities in the UK to provide sites for Travellers and giving them the power to close down existing sites. In Northern Ireland, opposition to Travellers' sites has been led by the Democratic Unionist Party.

However, Travellers make frequent use of other, non-authorised sites. These include public common land and private plots such as large fields and other privately owned lands. A famous example was the occupation of Dale Farm in Essex in 2010. The Travellers claim that there is an under-provision of authorised sites. The Gypsy Council estimates under-provision amounts to insufficient sites for 3,500 people.

List of Travellers' organisations

The following are some of the Travellers' representative organisations formed since the 1960s:
 Cork Traveller Visibility Group Ltd. (founded early 1990s)
 Friends, Families and Travellers
 Irish Traveller Community (1960s)
 Irish Traveller Movement (founded in 1990)
 Itinerant Settlement Committee (1960s–1980s)
 Justice 4 All Women & Children (founded in 2015)   
 Minceir Misli (1983–85)
 Minceirs Whiden Ireland, the all-Traveller Forum (Minceirs Whiden is Cant for "Travellers talking")
 National Traveller Women's Forum
 The Traveller Movement
 Travellers' Rights Committee (1981–83)
 Travellers' Education and Development Group (founded in 1984)
 Pavee Point (founded 1985)

Depictions and documentaries

Irish Travellers have been depicted, usually negatively but sometimes with some care and sympathy, in film, radio, print, and television. Shows like The Riches (2007–2008), the American television series featuring Eddie Izzard and Minnie Driver, take a deeper look into the Traveller lifestyle. The documentary series Big Fat Gypsy Weddings (2010, 2011, and 2012) has been commercially successful in the United Kingdom, offering glimpses of Traveller life as viewed at real-life weddings. A 1997 American film, Traveller, starring Bill Paxton and Mark Wahlberg, also explored the Travellers in America. In his 1993 documentary Rules of the Road German filmmaker Oliver Herbrich portrayed the Travellers in Ireland and the UK as a nomadic ethnic group forced to adapt to a settled lifestyle. Some of the main characters in the Irish sitcom Derry Girls encounter a group of Travellers in an episode that aired on 19 March 2019. Brad Pitt played a bare-knuckle Traveller boxer in the movie Snatch. The 2005 Irish horror film Isolation has Traveller characters in its plot.

See also

 Environmental inequality in Europe
 Halting site
 King of the Travellers

 Similar groups:

 Camminanti
 Mercheros
 Reisende/Skøyere
 Romani people
 Romanichal Travellers
 Scottish Travellers
 Travelling Showmen
 Voyageurs
 Welsh Kale
 Yenish Travellers

Explanatory notes

Citations

General and cited references 
 
 
 
 Collins, Laura Angela (2019) The Tinker Menace; the diary of an Irish Traveller, independently published,  
 
 
 
 
 
 
 
 
 
 
 
 
 
 
 .

External links

 Traveller Equality Project, Irish Chaplaincy in Britain
 Traveller Heritage and Photo Site from Navan Travellers Workshops
 Irish Travellers' Movement
 Pavee Point Travellers Centre
 Involve 
 Traveller and Roma Collection at the University of Limerick
 Oliver Herbrich: Rules of the Road (film website)
 The Travellers: Ireland's Ethnic Minority
 London Gypsy and Travellers Unit, Representing Traveller's issues in North and East London
 Friends, Families and Travellers. Advice and Information for Gypsies and Travellers 
 "Ireland's biggest minority group" 
 When is 'I do' taboo? 
 'The website of Cork Traveller Visibility Group Ltd' 
 'The Facebook page of Spring Lane Site Solidarity Group' 
 Office of the Children's Ombudsman report, "No End in Site - An investigation into the living conditions of children on a local authority halting site"

 
2001 United Kingdom census
Ethnic groups in Ireland
Ethnic groups in the United Kingdom
Indigenous peoples of Europe
Irish culture
Irish diaspora
Nomadic groups in Eurasia